This is a list of High Sheriffs of Bedfordshire.

Pre-Conquest
pre-1042: Aelfstan

1042-1066; Godric, Ralph Talgebose  Bondi the staller

1066–1125
1066-c.1084: Ansculf de Picquigny
 Ralph Taillebois
c. 1080 Hugh de Beauchamp
1124 Richard of Winchester

From 1125 through the end of 1575, appointees to the shrievalty held the joint office of High Sheriff of Bedfordshire and Buckinghamshire.

1575–1599

1600–1699

1700–1799

1800–1899

1900–1999

2000–present

References

Bibliography
 (with amendments of 1963, Public Record Office)

 
Bedfordshire
Lists of office-holders in the United Kingdom
High Sheriffs